Cecilia Krull (born June 29, 1986) is a Spanish singer best known as the singer of "Something's Triggered", the theme song of Three Steps Above Heaven, and "My Life Is Going On", the main theme song of Money Heist.

Biography
Born to a pianist father from France and a singer mother from Spain, Krull's career began at the age of 7 in Disney productions and continued until the age of 14. She reached international popularity in 2017 with the song "My Life Is Going On", the theme from the Netflix TV series Money Heist.

Selected discography
The Spanish singer has often worked with author Manel Santisteban, interpreting the following songs.

Singles
 "All My Fears", for the film Fuga de Cérebros (2009)
 "Something's Triggered", for the film A tres metros sobre el cielo (2010)
 "My Life Is Going On", the main theme song of Money Heist (2017)
 '"La verdad", for the TV series El Accidente (2018)
 "Agnus Dei", the main theme song of Vis a Vis (2019), with Mala Rodríguez

References

External links 
 
 Cecilia Krull at Rockol 

1986 births
Living people
Singers from Madrid
Spanish people of French descent
21st-century Spanish singers
21st-century Spanish women singers